Barwa Al Baraha (popularly known as Barwa Village) is a residential and commercial area mostly for expatriates in the Doha Industrial Area located south of the Industrial Area in Al Wakrah Municipality in Qatar. The project aims to provide a reasonable standard of living as defined by the new Human Rights Legislation.

Project 
The Barwa Al Baraha is built by Qatari contracting agency Barwa Group. Its budget was around $1.1 billion and the construction took place in Al Wakrah. Phase one of the project (truck park) was set to be completed at the end of 2008, whereas the project itself had an initial deadline of mid-2010. The deadline was met and the project was announced to be completed in 2010.

Facilities

Phase 1: Truck park 
The truck park has a holding capacity of 4,200 trucks. The Barwa Al Baraha truck park is the largest in the world, with advanced security equipment.

Phase 2: Residential area 
Along with 4.25 square meters of living space per person, the residential project provides parks, recreational areas, malls, and shops for labourers. It was planned to host up to 50,000 labourers on 1.8 square kilometres. This phase entailed the construction of 64 4-floor buildings, each having around 130 rooms able to host up to 6 labourers.

References 

Populated places in Al Wakrah
Planned cities in Qatar
Human rights in Qatar